Hathor 23 - Coptic Calendar - Hathor 25

The twenty-fourth day of the Coptic month of Hathor, the third month of the Coptic year. On a common year, this day corresponds to November 20, of the Julian Calendar, and December 3, of the Gregorian Calendar. This day falls in the Coptic season of Peret, the season of emergence. This day falls in the Nativity Fast.

Commemorations

Saints 

 The martyrdom of Bishop Narcees and Saint Thecla 
 The departure of Saint Proclus, the Patriarch of Constantinople

Other commemorations 

 The commemoration of the Twenty-Four Presbyters

References 

Days of the Coptic calendar